Adnan Khamis Mohammed Obaid Al-Talyani Al Suwaidi (born 30 October 1964) is a retired footballer from the United Arab Emirates who played as a forward in the UAE Football League club Al Shaab and the United Arab Emirates national team. for which he is one of the best football players in the UAE and one of the best goal scorers in the history of the UAE League and the national team.

Early life
Adnan was born in Sharjah, United Arab Emirates on 30 October 1964. In 1979, Al Talyani joined Al Shaab club volleyball team. In his free time he would go with his friends and family in Sharjah street's and play football. Adnan's older brother Nasser Al Talyani is also a football player and played as a midfielder in Al Shaab football team. There was a tournament that took place every year in the club and in 1979 Al Talyani played in the tournament and scored many goals. It caught attentions of Al Shaab owner Sheikh Faisal bin Khalid bin Mohammed Al Qassimi and convinced him to join the football team. He joined Al Shaab Team in 1980 and played besides his brother Nasser. Al Talyani has 3 boys. His sons are Hamdan, Hamad (born 1995), and Mohammed (born 1998). They have all participated in Talyani's retirement celebration in 2003.

Playing career

Club
Talyani started playing football in the 1970s in the streets Sharjah. He joined Al Shaab Club in 1979, and played out his entire club career there until 1999. Although he received many lucrative offers from other clubs, strict restrictions at the time prohibited Talyani from transferring.

International
Upon the selection of Heshmat Mohajerani (the former trainer of the Iran national team) as the trainer of the UAE national team, Talyani was selected as a member of the team. He retired from international football in 1997 as the all-time leader in international appearances, with 161 and 56 goals. As of March 2016, he was tenth on the all-time list for men.

1990 FIFA World Cup Qualification 
The UAE national team’s qualification for the 1990 World Cup was and remains the most important achievement in the history of Emirati football, and Al Talyani played a major role in this qualification. The UAE did not qualify easily, after facing several obstacles on its way, the most important of which was in the first round, during the confrontation with the Kuwait national team. The UAE entered the 3rd match of the first stage in the qualification against the Kuwait national team and it's required to win to compensate for its 3-2 loss in the first round and to disrupt the top competitor at the time. Al Talyani scored the victory goal to win 1-0 vs Kuwait and the national team took the lead in the group. Then Al Talyani led the UAE 4-1 victory over Pakistan, to ensure his country qualified for the second stage. The second and final stage included 6 teams participating in a one-round tournament that qualified the first and second for the finals, which is what the UAE and South Korean did. The UAE only achieved a lonely victory in the decisive stage, with a score of 2-1 over China, scored by Al Talyani in the 88th minute, to turn the match from 1-0 down to win 2-1. Al Talyani's second goal in the final stage gave the UAE a 1-1 draw with South Korea, in the last round, so that the UAE won the sixth point and qualified for the World Cup for the first time in the country's history. Al Talyani participated in all of the UAE World Cup matches against Colombia, Germany, and Yugoslavia.

1996 AFC Asian Cup 
Six years after their historic World Cup 90 debut, the UAE was preparing for another once-in-a-lifetime tournament. The UAE was to host the AFC Asian Cup for the first time in its history, and the hopes of a country stood on the shoulders of a team that featured “Generation 90” veterans such as Al Talyani and goalkeeper Muhsen Musabbeh, as well as youngsters such as Munther Ali. At the age of 32, Al Talyani scored two vital goals: one at Kuwait, which ended 3-2 for the UAE and the goal remains one of the most unforgettable goals in UAE history, and another in Indonesia, which ended in a 2-0 win for the UAE.

The Final Match at Asian cup 1996, they faced Saudi Arabia in front of 60,000 fans at Zayed Sports City. The Saudis had previously won the trophy twice, but had lost the previous edition's final to Japan in 1992. As the game entered extra time with a goalless tie, Al Talyani was withdrawn because his legs couldn't handle another 120 minutes of action after playing the full 90 minutes in the semi-final against Kuwait. The teams had to be divided by penalty shoot-outs, and the Emiratis lost in the end.

Honours

Club
Al Shaab
 UAE President's Cup: 1992-93
 UAE Super Cup: 1993
 Asian Cup Winners' Cup: Second Place 1994-95
 UAE First Division League: 1992–93, 1997-98

International
United Arab Emirates
Fifa World Cup: Qualified 1990
AFC Asian Cup Second Place: 1996
AFC Asian Cup Fourth Place: 1992

Individual
UAE Football League Top Scorer: 1984-85
UAE Football League Top Scorer: 1986-87
Asian Cup Winners' Cup: Best Player: 1994-95
Asian Footballer of the Year: 3rd in 1990
Best Arabic Player: 1989
UAE First Division League: Top Scorer: 1992–93
UAE Football League: 1992-93 Best Player
UAE Player of the Century

Career statistics

International goals

Legacy 
The 1996 AFC Asian Cup remains to date the UAE’s greatest footballing achievement alongside competing in the 1990 FIFA World Cup. Al Talyani was a crucial part of both achievements. And will thus be remembered as his nation’s finest and one of Asian football’s greatest icons.

Retirement
Talyani officially retired from football in January 2003. A testimonial match was played in his honour between Italian champions Juventus and an All-Star team of players from various countries. He has since been named the UAE's Player of the Century.

See also

List of men's footballers with 100 or more international caps
List of men's footballers with 50 or more international goals
Asian Footballer of the Year
List of one-club men

References

External links

 

1964 births
Living people
People from the Emirate of Sharjah
Emirati footballers
United Arab Emirates international footballers
1984 AFC Asian Cup players
1988 AFC Asian Cup players
1990 FIFA World Cup players
1992 AFC Asian Cup players
1996 AFC Asian Cup players
1997 FIFA Confederations Cup players
FIFA Century Club
Al-Shaab CSC players
Association football forwards
Footballers at the 1986 Asian Games
Footballers at the 1994 Asian Games
UAE Pro League players
Asian Games competitors for the United Arab Emirates